Rohri Tehsil  is an administrative subdivision (tehsil) of Sukkur District in the Sindh province of Pakistan, the town of Rohri is the capital.

Administration
Assistant Commissioner of Taluka Rohri is Mr. Awais Mushtaq Khokhar(PAS-42nd CTP). Rohri Taluka is administratively subdivided into 11 Union Councils.

References

Talukas of Sindh
Sukkur District